Nilson Ricardo da Silva Junior (born 31 March 1989), or simply Nilson, is a Brazilian footballer who plays for Bucheon FC as a defensive midfielder.

Career 
He joined J1 League side Sagan Tosu in July 2013 and moved to Busan IPark in South Korea in 2014. In his first season with the Korean side, Nilson played initially as a defensive midfielder, but later took the central role in a three-man defence. After a stint with Brazilian side Salgueiro, Nilson returned to Busan IPark in 2016 following their relegation to the K League 2.

References

External links

1989 births
Living people
Brazilian footballers
Brazilian expatriate footballers
J1 League players
K League 1 players
K League 2 players
Campeonato Brasileiro Série A players
Campeonato Brasileiro Série B players
Clube Náutico Capibaribe players
Araripina Futebol Clube players
Clube Atlético Metropolitano players
Associação Olímpica de Itabaiana players
Sagan Tosu players
Busan IPark players
Salgueiro Atlético Clube players
FC Anyang players
Expatriate footballers in Japan
Brazilian expatriate sportspeople in Japan
Expatriate footballers in South Korea
Brazilian expatriate sportspeople in South Korea
Association football midfielders
Sportspeople from Recife